Demre is a town and district in the Antalya Province on the Mediterranean coast of Turkey, named after the river Demre.

Demre is the Lycian town of Myra, the home of Saint Nicholas of Myra. The district was known as Kale until it was renamed in 2005. Until the 1920s the majority of people who lived in Demre (Myra) were Christian Greeks. At that time this majority migrated to Greece as part of the 1923 population exchange between Greece and Turkey. The abandoned Greek villages in the region are a striking reminder of this exodus. Abandoned Greek houses can still be seen at Demre and the regions of Kalkan, Kaş and Kayaköy, a Greek ghost town. A small population of Turkish farmers moved into the region when the Greeks migrated. The region is popular with tourists today, particularly Christian pilgrims who visit the tomb of Saint Nicholas.

Geography
Demre is on the coast of the Teke peninsula, west of the bay of Antalya, with the Taurus Mountains behind. The mountains are forested and the coastal strip is made of good soil brought down by the mountain rivers. The climate is the typical Mediterranean pattern of hot dry summers and warm wet winters.

Before the tourism boom began in the 1980s the local economy depended on agriculture, which is still important today. The villages of Demre grow pomegranates and citrus fruits and now a large quantity of fruits and vegetables all year round in greenhouses. Also with its rich history, attractions like the island of Kekova, the sea and warm weather, this coast is very popular with holidaymakers from Turkey and all over Europe, although Demre still does not have the high volume of tourists enjoyed by districts nearer Antalya Airport. Some local handicrafts like rug making, and events such as the annual camel wrestling festival bring in extra income.

The local cuisine includes fish and other seafood from the Mediterranean.

Demographics
The district has a population of 25,078 according to the 2010 census. The town itself has 15,899 inhabitants. Demre has one municipality (Beymelek) and nine villages.

The populations (2007) of the main centres are shown in the table (Municipalities are shown in bold)

History
See Myra for details of the history and archaeology of the city of Myra (today's Demre) and the history of Saint Nicholas of Myra (Santa Claus).

Myra was one of the most important cities in ancient Lycia. Coins have been found dating back to 300 BC, but logically the city must have been founded centuries earlier. The city thrived as part of the Roman Empire and many public buildings were built.

In February 2021, Akdeniz University researchers led by Nevzat Çevik announced the discovery of dozens of 2,200-year-old terracotta sculptures with inscriptions in Myra. Archaeologists also revealed some material remains of the Hellenistic theater made of ceramic, bronze, lead, and silver. The figurines with partly preserved paint contained the appearances of men, women, cavalry, animals, some Greek deities and the names of artists.

Places of interest
 A number of tombs with a particular local style.
 The Roman theatre and other remains of Roman Myra, in the town of Demre.
 Tombs carved into the rocks.
 The church of St Nicholas of Myra, honoring the bishop of Myra and the man popularly known as Santa Claus.
 The antique cities of Andriake and Simena
 A boat trip to the islands and sunken ruins of Kekova.

See also
 Saint Nicholas#Myra

References

External links

 Demre municipality
 Photos from Demre

Turkish Riviera
Antalya
Former Greek towns in Turkey
Populated places in Antalya Province
Districts of Antalya Province
Lycia